Charles Herndon (1877-1927), American politician from Arizona
 Charles Herndon, American artist